RuPaul: What's the Tee? (also known as RuPaul: What's the Tee w/ Michelle Visage) is a comedy podcast first released on April 9, 2014 hosted by American entertainers RuPaul and Michelle Visage. The hosts discuss a wide range of subjects and usually have at least one celebrity guest appear per episode. They often discuss behind-the-scenes topics from RuPaul's Drag Race, where RuPaul and Visage are also hosts. The podcast won a Webby Award in 2018. 

At the 2018 RuPaul's DragCon NYC, RuPaul and Visage held three live tapings of the podcast.

Guests
Celebrity guests have included Anastacia, Emma Bunton, Frances Bean Cobain, Elvira, Lady Gaga, Debbie Harry, Marc Jacobs, Rose McGowan, Moby, Kathy Najimy, and Henry Rollins, among many others.

Reception
Noisey stated, "Honestly, this podcast slays the podcast game. After one hour of listening to RuPaul and Michelle Visage chat about sex, drugs, mental health, musicals, drag queens, Hollywood and the infinite wisdom of Judge Judy, you will feel as if your life is an empty vortex of nothingness when they are not making sounds into your ears."

Hornet stated "Any Drag Race fan knows that if they want the scoop, they should listen to What's the Tee?" 

RuPaul: What's the Tee? won a Webby Award for Best Host in 2018, with both RuPaul and Visage being listed. In 2017 and 2019 the podcast won the WOWIE Award for Best Podcast. In 2020 the podcast was the runner-up for the Queerty Award in the Podcast category.

References

Comedy and humor podcasts
Works by RuPaul
Audio podcasts
LGBT-related podcasts
2014 podcast debuts
Interview podcasts